The 2012–2013 Cyclo-cross Superprestige events and season-long competition took place between 7 October 2012 and 16 February 2013.  Sven Nys won it for the 12th time, leading the classification from start to finish.

Results

Season standings
In each race, the top 15 riders gain points, going from 15 points for the winner decreasing by one point per position to 1 point for the rider finishing in 15th position. In case of ties in the total score of two or more riders, the result of the last race counts as decider. If this is not decisive because two or more riders scored no points, the penultimate race counts, and so on until there is a difference.

References

External links 
 Official Website

S
S
Cyclo-cross Superprestige